United States Post Office—Charleroi is a historic building in Charleroi, Pennsylvania. It is designated as a historic public landmark by the Washington County History & Landmarks Foundation.  It now houses the John K. Tener Library .

References

External links
[ National Register nomination form]

Charleroi
Colonial Revival architecture in Pennsylvania
Government buildings completed in 1909
Buildings and structures in Washington County, Pennsylvania
National Register of Historic Places in Washington County, Pennsylvania